The 2003 Ole Miss Rebels football team represented the University of Mississippi during the 2003 NCAA Division I-A football season.  Coached by David Cutcliffe, the Rebels played their home games at Vaught–Hemingway Stadium.

Season
In the Egg Bowl, Ole Miss beat Mississippi State by a score of 31–0. Ole Miss held the lead in the series with 57 wins, 37 losses and 6 ties.

Schedule

Game Summaries

Vanderbilt

Memphis

Louisiana–Monroe

Team players in the NFL

Awards and honors
 Eli Manning, Johnny Unitas Golden Arm Award
 Eli Manning, Maxwell Award
 Jonathan Nichols, Lou Groza Award

References

Ole Miss
Ole Miss Rebels football seasons
Cotton Bowl Classic champion seasons
Ole Miss Rebels football